A status referendum was held on the island of Sint Maarten in October 1994. The referendum was the result of a discussion about the future of the Netherlands Antilles, following the secession of Aruba in 1986. While most politicians, including the government of the Netherlands Antilles and the island government campaigned in favour of secession of Sint Maarten to make it form a country of its own within the Kingdom of the Netherlands, the option of retaining and restructuring the Netherlands Antilles came out in favour. This resulted in the rise of the Party for the Restructured Antilles.

Result

See also
Dissolution of the Netherlands Antilles

References

Referendums in Sint Maarten
Referendums in the Netherlands Antilles
Sint Maarten referendum
Sint Maarten
Sint Maarten
Sint Maarten